James William Edmonds (4 June 1951 – 14 June 2011) was an English cricketer.  Edmonds was a right-handed batsman who bowled left-arm fast-medium.  He was born at Smethwick, Staffordshire.
 
Edmonds made a single first-class appearance for Lancashire against Cambridge University at Fenner's in 1975.  Cambridge University won the toss and elected to bat first, making 232 all out in their first-innings, during which Edmonds bowled 20.5 overs for 52, taking the wickets of Richard Smyth, Stephen Wookey, and Mark Allbrook.  Lancashire then made 409 declared in their first-innings, during which Edmonds wasn't required to bat.  Cambridge University reached 240/6 in their second-innings, at which point the match was declared a draw.  This was his only major appearance for Lancashire.

He died at Sutton Coldfield, Warwickshire, on 14 June 2011.

References

External links
James Edmonds at ESPNcricinfo
James Edmonds at CricketArchive

1951 births
2011 deaths
Sportspeople from Smethwick
English cricketers
Lancashire cricketers